The Asia/Oceania Zone was one of three zones of regional competition in the 1995 Fed Cup.

Group I
Venue: Jang Choong Tennis Centre, Jung-gu, South Korea (outdoor clay)
Date: 18–22 April

The eight teams were divided into two pools of four teams. The top two teams of each pool play-off in a two-round knockout stage to decide which nation progresses to World Group II play-offs. Nations finishing in the bottom place in each pool were relegated to Asia/Oceania Zone Group II for 1996.

Pools

Knockout stage

  advanced to World Group II Play-offs.
  and  relegated to Group II in 1996.

Group II
Venue: Maharashtra L.T.A., Mumbai, India (outdoor clay)
Date: 8–11 March

The seven teams were divided into two pools of three and four. The top two teams from each pool then moved on to the play-off stage of the competition. The two teams that won one match from the play-off stage would advance to Group I for 1996.

Pools

Play-offs

  and  promoted to Asia/Oceania Group I in 1996.

See also
Fed Cup structure

References

 Fed Cup Profile, South Korea
 Fed Cup Profile, Thailand
 Fed Cup Profile, Kazakhstan
 Fed Cup Profile, China
 Fed Cup Profile, Hong Kong
 Fed Cup Profile, Philippines
 Fed Cup Profile, Uzbekistan
 Fed Cup Profile, Singapore
 Fed Cup Profile, India
 Fed Cup Profile, Malaysia
 Fed Cup Profile, Sri Lanka

External links
 Fed Cup website

 
Asia Oceania
Fed Cup Asia/Oceania Zone
Fed Cup Asia/Oceania Zone
Sport in Seoul
Tennis tournaments in South Korea
Sports competitions in Mumbai
Tennis tournaments in India